Head of Camille Claudel is a polychrome glass paste sculpture by the French artist Auguste Rodin, conceived in 1884 and executed in 1911. It is now in the Museo Soumaya in Mexico City. It shows his then studio assistant Camille Claudel in a Phrygian cap.

Background
Claudel, a now-renowned sculptor, studied under Rodin's friend Alfred Boucher and then with Rodin. Rodin took over Boucher's classes, took Claudel on as a studio assistant, and they soon became associates and lovers. He produced the head during the early stages of their collaboration.

See also
List of sculptures by Auguste Rodin
List of sculptures by Camille Claudel

References

External links

1884 sculptures
Sculptures by Auguste Rodin
Sculptures of the Museo Soumaya
Camille Claudel
Glass works of art